The Rage in Placid Lake is a 2003 Australian film starring Ben Lee and Rose Byrne. It features Placid Lake (Lee), a seventeen-year-old boy who has led a suburban hippie life with his neurotic, free loving parents. The film documents his journey of self-discovery as he rejects his hippie roots and embraces the mundane by working for an insurance agency, much to his parents' horror.

Plot
Precocious, bohemian teenager Placid Lake finishes high school, but after having an existential crisis devises a plan to totally reinvent himself as a functioning member of society. With a few weeks spent reading a library of self-help manuals, Lake gets a haircut, buys a bespoke suit, and finds a white collar job at an insurance agency. Lake has a smart friend Gemma (Rose Byrne) who tries to talk him out of his newly-found economic rationalism.

Lake is adamant about becoming an acceptable member of society and ignores the signs of disapproval from his parents and best friend. Yet, by continuing his venture to normality, Lake struggles with what to say, think, and wear due to his insecurity and neurosis. Lake realizes that living to society's standards does not satisfy him as much as he had hoped. Eventually, this causes him to revert to his original personality and become content with who he is.

Cast and characters 
 Ben Lee as Placid Lake
 Rose Byrne as Gemma Taylor
 Miranda Richardson as Sylvia Lake
 Garry McDonald as Doug Lake

Box office
The Rage in Placid Lake grossed $482,798 at the box office in Australia.

Reception
Based on 15 reviews collected by the film review aggregator Rotten Tomatoes, 53% of critics gave The Rage in Placid Lake a positive review, with an average rating of 6.1/10.

Awards

See also
Cinema of Australia

References

External links

The Rage In Placid Lake at the National Film and Sound Archive

2003 films
2003 comedy films
Australian comedy films
Hippie films
Films scored by Cezary Skubiszewski
2000s English-language films
2000s Australian films